Southend Water Aerodrome  is located  west of Southend, Saskatchewan, Canada.

See also 
 List of airports in Saskatchewan
 Southend/Hans Ulricksen Field Aerodrome

References

Registered aerodromes in Saskatchewan
Seaplane bases in Saskatchewan